The Source Hip Hop Music Awards 1999 is a music compilation album contributed by The Source magazine. Released August 17, 1999 and distributed by Def Jam Recordings, Hip Hop Music Awards 1999 is the first annual album produced by the magazine to focus on its nominees of the now-defunct award show, owing to the success of its Hip Hop Hits series. It features eighteen hip hop and rap hits. It went to number 53 on the Top R&B/Hip Hop Albums chart and peaked at number 45 on the Billboard 200 album chart.

Three songs reached the number one position on the Hot Rap Tracks chart:  "Deja Vu (Uptown Baby)," "It Ain't My Fault Part 2" and "Superthug".

Track listing
Can I Get A... - Ja Rule, Jay-Z and Amil
Ha - Juvenile
My Name Is - Eminem
It Ain't My Fault, Pt. 2 - Mystikal and Silkk the Shocker
Party Is Goin' on over Here - Busta Rhymes
It's On - DJ Clue and DMX
I'll Bee Dat! - Redman
Superthug - Noreaga
Deja Vu (Uptown Baby) - Lord Tariq & Peter Gunz
Thug Girl - Master P
Is It You? (Déjà Vu) - Made Men and Master P
Break Ups 2 Make Ups - D'Angelo and Method Man
Skew It on the Bar-B - Outkast and Raekwon
Joints & Jam - The Black Eyed Peas
Militia - Big Shug, Freddie Foxxx and Gang Starr
Find a Way - A Tribe Called Quest
You Got Me - Erykah Badu and The Roots
5 Mics (The Source Anthem) - The Committee, El Drek and Kurupt

References

Hip hop compilation albums
1999 compilation albums